Mukim Sengkurong is a mukim in Brunei-Muara District, Brunei. The population was 31,493 in 2016.

Name 
The mukim is named after Kampong Sengkurong, one of the villages it encompasses.

Geography 
The mukim is located in the western- and north-westernmost part of the district, bordering the South China Sea to the north, Mukim Gadong 'A' to the east, Mukim Kilanas to the south-east, Mukim Pengkalan Batu to the south and Mukim Keriam in Tutong District to the west.

Off the coastline of Mukim Sengkurong there are various land extensions to the sea. Some of these prominent 'land extensions' are located near Empire Hotel & Country Club and Pantai Jerudong. These man-made modifications include two, spit-like long extensions towards the sea that forms an almost lagoon-like enclosure that surrounds a body of water to the left and right. Within this 'lagoon' is also a man-made island. Almost all the coastline of Mukim Sengkurong has been modified and added with various 'land extensions' with different shapes and sizes and some pine trees are also planted on them.

Demographics 
As of 2016 census, the population was 31,493 with  males and  females. The mukim had 5,953 households occupying 5,880 dwellings. Among the population,  lived in urban areas, while the remainder of  lived in rural areas.

Villages 
As of 2016, the mukim comprised the following census villages:

Other locations
Other locations within the mukim include:

 Pantai Jerudong
 Pulau Pungit

Notes

References 

Sengkurong
Brunei-Muara District